Jason Plumhoff (born August 9, 1991) is an American-German soccer player.

Early life
Plumhoff was born in Rosenheim, Germany to American parents who had settled in southern Bavaria. He lived in Germany until the age of 15, playing in the Bayern Munich and SpVgg Unterhaching youth systems. His father, who worked for the U.S. government, was then relocated to Fort Meade, Maryland.

Playing career

College and amateur
Plumhoff played college soccer at La Salle University between 2010 and 2013. In 2013, he was named Atlantic 10 Conference Offensive Player of the Year, Philadelphia Soccer 6 Player of the Year, NSCAA All-Region First Team and ECAC All-Star.

While at college, Plumhoff appeared for USL PDL club Ocean City Nor'easters in 2012, and played with fellow PDL club Reading United AC in 2013.

Harrisburg City
Plumhoff signed with United Soccer League club Harrisburg City Islanders on March 24, 2015. Jason finished the season as the Islanders leading scorer with 10 goals.

Edmonton
Plumhoff joined Canadian club FC Edmonton on February 25, 2016.  Plumhoff scored his first NASL goal in a 2-1 victory over the New York Cosmos on May 15, 2016.

FC Edmonton traded Plumhoff to Jacksonville Armada FC in exchange for defender Shawn Nicklaw on July 6, 2016.

Jackonsville
Plumhoff, who came to Jacksonville on July 6 from NASL club FC Edmonton in a trade for Shawn Nicklaw, has made five appearances, including two starts, with the Armada.

Saint Louis FC
The Jacksonville Armada FC announced on Friday it has sent midfielder Jason Plumhoff to United Soccer League side Saint Louis FC on a four-week loan.

Indy Eleven
Plumhoff joined Indy Eleven on May 5 and went on to make 6 appearances, scoring 1 goal against former club FC Edmonton.

Return to Harrisburg
Plumhoff re-signed with United Soccer League club Harrisburg City Islanders on July 21, 2017.

References

External links
 La Salle University bio

1991 births
Living people
German footballers
American soccer players
La Salle Explorers men's soccer players
Ocean City Nor'easters players
Reading United A.C. players
Penn FC players
FC Edmonton players
Jacksonville Armada FC players
Saint Louis FC players
Association football midfielders
Soccer players from Maryland
USL League Two players
USL Championship players
North American Soccer League players
Expatriate soccer players in Canada
Indy Eleven players
People from Fort Meade, Maryland
Sportspeople from Anne Arundel County, Maryland
People from Rosenheim
Sportspeople from Upper Bavaria
Footballers from Bavaria